Rude is a 1995 Canadian crime film directed by Clement Virgo. It was screened in the Un Certain Regard section at the 1995 Cannes Film Festival, before having its Canadian premiere at the 1995 Toronto International Film Festival as the opening film of the Perspectives Canada program.

Plot
Set in Toronto, Ontario, the film tells three distinct but interrelated stories about Black Canadian life in the impoverished Regent Park neighbourhood of the city. One focuses on "The General" (Maurice Dean Wint), a drug dealer trying to rebuild his life with the help of his brother Reece (Clark Johnson) after being released from prison; one centres on Jordan (Richard Chevolleau), an amateur boxer who is convinced to take part in a gay-bashing which forces him to finally confront his own repressed homosexuality; the third centres on Maxine (Rachael Crawford), a woman who has recently been dumped by her longtime boyfriend after having an abortion. All three stories are tied together by the voice of Rude (Sharon Lewis), a disc jockey for a pirate radio station in the neighbourhood.

Cast
 Maurice Dean Wint - General
 Rachael Crawford - Maxine
 Clark Johnson - Reece
 Richard Chevolleau - Jordan
 Sharon Lewis - Rude (as Sharon M. Lewis)
 Melanie Nicholls-King - Jessica
 Stephen Shellen - Yankee
 Gordon Michael Woolvett - Ricky
 Dayo Ade - Mike
 Dean Marshall - Joe
 Ashley Brown - Johnny
 Andy Marshall - Addict
 Junior Williams - Curtis

Production
Produced with the assistance of the Canadian Film Centre, Rude was the first Canadian dramatic feature to be written, produced, and directed by an all-black team. It was hailed, along with Soul Survivor, as ushering in a new Black Canadian film aesthetic.

Awards
At TIFF, the film received an honorable mention from the jury for the Best Canadian Film award.

The film received eight Genie Award nominations at the 16th Genie Awards in 1996, for Best Picture, Best Director (Virgo), Best Supporting Actor (Johnson), Best Supporting Actress (Crawford), Best Screenplay (Virgo), Best Cinematography (Barry Stone), Best Editing (Susan Maggi) and Best Original Score (Aaron Davis and John Lang).

Restoration
In 2017 the film was digitally restored by Technicolor, Toronto and Montreal, under the supervision of Virgo and producer Damon D'Oliveira.  The restored version screened in the Cinematheque section of the 2017 Toronto International Film Festival.

References

External links

1995 films
1990s crime films
1995 LGBT-related films
Canadian LGBT-related films
English-language Canadian films
Films directed by Clement Virgo
LGBT-related drama films
Canadian Film Centre films
Canadian boxing films
Hood films
Regent Park
1990s English-language films
1990s American films
1990s Canadian films